The Women's flyweight boxing competition at the 2014 Commonwealth Games in Glasgow, Scotland took place between July 28 and August 2 at the Scottish Exhibition and Conference Centre. For the first time ever women's boxing will be contested.

Like all Commonwealth boxing events, the competition was a straight single-elimination tournament. Both semifinal losers were awarded bronze medals, so no boxers competed again after their first loss. Bouts consisted of four rounds of two minutes each, with one-minute breaks between rounds. Punches scored only if the front of the glove made full contact with the front of the head or torso of the opponent. Three judges scored each bout; The winner of the bout was the boxer who won the most rounds.

Medalists

Results
All times are British Summer Time (UTC+1)

References

Boxing at the 2014 Commonwealth Games
2014 in women's boxing